Martin Robert Bridson  is a Manx mathematician. He is 
the Whitehead Professor of Pure Mathematics at the University of Oxford, and President of the Clay Mathematics Institute. He was previously Head of Oxford's Mathematical Institute. He is a Fellow of Magdalen College, Oxford and an Honorary Fellow of Hertford College, Oxford. Specializing in geometry, topology and group theory, Bridson is best known for his work in geometric group theory.

Education and early life

Bridson is a native of the Isle of Man. He was educated at St Ninian's High School, Douglas, then Hertford College, Oxford, and Cornell University, receiving a Master of Arts degree from Oxford in 1986, and a Master of Science degree in 1988 followed by a PhD in 1991 from Cornell. His PhD thesis was supervised by Karen Vogtmann, and was entitled Geodesics and Curvature in Metric Simplicial Complexes.

Career and research
He was an assistant professor at Princeton University until 1996, was twice a visiting professor at the University of Geneva (1992 and 2006), and was Professor of Mathematics at Imperial College London from 2002 to 2007. From 1993 to 2002 he was a Tutorial Fellow of Pembroke College, Oxford, and  Reader (1996) then Professor of Topology (2000) in the University of Oxford. He remains a Supernumerary Fellow of Pembroke College. In 2016, Bridson became only the second Manxman to ever be elected to the Royal Society, after Edward Forbes.  In 2020, he was elected to Academia Europaea. With André Haefliger, he won
the 2020 Steele Prize for Mathematical Exposition for the highly influential book Metric Spaces of Non-positive Curvature, published by Springer-Verlag in 1999.

Honours and awards
Bridson was an invited lecturer at the International Congress of Mathematicians in 2006.
 2016 Elected a Fellow of the Royal Society.
 2014 Elected a Fellow of the American Mathematical Society.
 1999 Whitehead Prize
 2012 Royal Society Wolfson Research Merit Award 
 2020 Elected Member of Academia Europaea
 2020 Steele Prize of the American Mathematical Society

References 

1964 births
Living people
People educated at St Ninian's High School, Douglas
Alumni of Hertford College, Oxford
20th-century British mathematicians
21st-century British mathematicians
Fellows of Magdalen College, Oxford
Fellows of Pembroke College, Oxford
Statutory Professors of the University of Oxford
Whitehead Prize winners
Fellows of the American Mathematical Society
Fellows of the Royal Society
People from Douglas, Isle of Man
Members of Academia Europaea